Big Day is an American situation comedy that revolves around the preparation for a wedding.

(The) Big Day may also refer to:
 Jour de fête or The Big Day, a 1949 French film
 "The Big Day" (Rocket Power), the series finale of Rocket Power
 The Big Day (1959 film), a 1959 Australian television drama
 The Big Day (1960 film), a 1960 British drama film
 The Big Day (album), a 2019 album by Chance the Rapper
 The Big Day, a novel by Barry Unsworth
 "Big Day", a 1986 song by XTC from Skylarking
  The Big Day, an album by Kelly Chen

See also 
 "Big Days", an episode of How I Met Your Mother
 Lieldienas or Big Days, a celebration on March 23 in ancient Latvia
 Big Day Out (disambiguation)